Dawson Township is located in McLean County, Illinois. As of the 2010 census, its population was 590 and it contained 253 housing units.

History
Dawson Township was originally named Lee Township, but changed to Padua Township on May 17, 1858, and then to Dawson on an unknown date. Dawson Township was named for John Wells Dawson, a pioneer settler.

Geography

Demographics

References

External links
City-data.com
Illinois State Archives

Townships in McLean County, Illinois
Townships in Illinois